The Louisiana Department of Agriculture and Forestry (LDAF) is a state agency of Louisiana, headquartered in Baton Rouge.  The Department is responsible for promoting, protecting and advancing agriculture and forestry, and soil and water resources.

The Department is under the supervision of the Commissioner of Agriculture and Forestry. The current Commissioner is Dr. Michael G. Strain, a Republican veterinarian first elected in 2007.

Strain's Democratic predecessors as agriculture commissioner include:

 Harry D. Wilson (1916 – January 1948)
 Millard Perkins (1948 interim)
 W. E. Anderson (1948–1952)
 Dave L. Pearce (1952–1956)
 Sidney McCrory (1956–1960)
 Dave L. Pearce (1960–1976)
 Gil Dozier (1976–1980)
 Bob Odom (1980–2008)

Organization
The Department is under the control of the Commissioner of Agriculture and Forestry, who is elected statewide. The Commissioner is assisted by a Deputy Commissioner and six Assistant Commissioners.

Commissioner of Agriculture and Forestry
Deputy Commissioner
Assistant Commissioner
Office of Agricultural and Environmental Science
Agricultural Chemistry Programs Division
Horticulture and Quarantine Programs Division
Pesticide and Environmental Programs Division
Seed Programs Division
Assistant Commissioner
Office of Agro-Consumer Services
Agricultural Commodities Commission
Dairy Division
Weights and Measures Division
Assistant Commissioner / State Veterinarian
Office of Animal Health and Food Safety Services
Veterinary Health Division
Food Quality Services Division
Investigative Services Division
Assistant Commissioner / State Forester
Office of Forestry
Forest Management Division
Forest Protection Division
Forestry Enforcement Division
Urban Forestry Division
Reforestation Division
Assistant Commissioner
Office of Marketing and Agricultural Economic Development
Agricultural Economic Development Division
Market Development Division
Market News Division
Special Events/Dairy Promotions Division
Assistant Commissioner
Office of Soil and Water Conservation
Conservation District Services Division
Agricultural Solid Waste Management Division
Agricultural Nonpoint Source Pollution Abatement Division
Coastal Wetlands Re-vegetation Division
Conservation Information and Education Division
Conservation Reserve Enhancement Program Division
Farm Bill Program Assistance Division

References

External links

 Louisiana Department of Agriculture and Forestry

agriculture
State departments of agriculture of the United States
State forestry agencies in the United States